Johanna Hendrica Martens (18 October 1818, in Zutphen – 4 March 1867, 
in Amsterdam) was a Dutch woman, known for the last court case about a woman posing as a man to enlist in the army in the Netherlands.

Martens was born to Engbert Martens and Christina van Bemen, a catholic family in Zutphen. She became a maid in Amsterdam and fell in love with an infantryman to the dislike of both her family and employer, and who followed him dressed as a man when he left the town with his regiment to enlist in order to be near him. On her way there, she was arrested for theft and exposed. The case attracted great attention in contemporary Dutch press for its romantic circumstances and the defense used this by claiming that she had been led to her crime blinded by love. She was sentenced to four years in prison in 1839. After her prison time she became a seamster and married four times in Amsterdam: in August 1844 with Theodorus Hendricus Koster (1821–bef.1851), in August 1851 with Fredrik Johannes Vrijberg (1823–1854), in January 1856 with Harmanus Kok, a widower with 9 children (1805–1857), and on 4 May 1859 with Antonius Koopman, a widower with 4 children (1820–1898).

References 

1818 births
1867 deaths
19th-century Dutch women
Female-to-male cross-dressers
People from Zutphen